Alexander Lorrimer (9 January 1859 – 2 January 1947) was an English cricketer.  Lorrimer was a right-handed batsman.  He was born at Leicester.

Lorrimer made his first-class debut for Leicestershire against Warwickshire in 1894 at Grace Road (a match in which his brother, David, also made his first-class debut).  He made five further first-class appearances for the county, the last of which came against Derbyshire in the 1896 County Championship.  In his six matches he scored 174 runs at an average of 14.50, with a high score of 46.

He died at Oadby, Leicestershire, on 2 January 1947.

References

External links
Alexander Lorrimer at ESPNcricinfo
Alexander Lorrimer at CricketArchive

1859 births
1947 deaths
Cricketers from Leicester
English cricketers
Leicestershire cricketers